Lilit Martirosyan is an Armenian LGBTQ+ rights activist and the founder of the Right Side NGO, an Armenian transgender rights group.

Biography

Early life
After facing intense bullying and family conflicts as a child, she moved out of her parents' home to live on her own at the age of 13. Despite working both as a waitress and a cook, she was eventually forced to do sex work to earn enough money to survive and to be able to afford hormone therapy.

In 2015, she became the first trans woman in Armenian history to legally change her name in her passport.

Right Side NGO
In 2016, she co-founded the Right Side NGO.

In April 2019, she gave a speech to the National Assembly of Armenia, becoming the first openly trans woman to do so. In her speech, she described the violence and discrimination faced by the trans community in Armenia, saying that they were left "unemployed, poor and morally abandoned," and talked about the influence of the LGBT+ community in the 2018 Armenian revolution in the hopes for better rights. Her speech faced a significant backlash, including multiple death threats and local press publicizing her home address. Naira Zohrabyan, the representative of the chair of the Assembly's Human Rights Committee and a member of the Prosperous Armenia party, accused her of having "violated our agenda," despite having been the MP who gave the floor to Martirosyan, and with Prosperous Armenia MP Vartan Ghukasyan calling for trans people to be "expelled from the country". Prime Minister Nikol Pashinyan accused Zohrabyan of staging the speech as a "political provocation."

In 2020, she was awarded the Human Rights Tulip by the government of the Netherlands.

In March 2022, Martirosyan participated in a digital panel discussion entitled "Improving Allyship For Armenian LGBTQIA+ Communities." Panelists included Yerevan State University professor Vahan Bournazian; Pink Armenia director Mamikon Hovsepyan; Charachchi member Perch Melikyan; and Erik Adamian of GALAS LGBTQ+ Armenian Society, ONE Archives Foundation and Charachchi.

In 2023, Martirosyan and Right Side staff members went on a working visit to the United States, and met with organizations such as the National Endowment for Democracy, Urgent Action Fund for Women's Human Rights, Human Rights Campaign, Global Fund for Women, Freedom House, Astraea Lesbian Foundation For Justice, and the National Democratic Institute. GALAS LGBTQ+ Armenian Society hosted Right Side NGO founder Lilit Martirosyan in Glendale, California for a public discussion on the situation of LGBTQ+ people in Armenia, discrimination and human rights violations, and how supporters living in the United States can support LGBTQ+ people living in Armenia.

See also 
 LGBT rights in Armenia

References 

Living people
Armenian LGBT rights activists
21st-century Armenian people
Year of birth missing (living people)
Transgender women
Armenian LGBT people